Alexandra Jennifer Beukes is a South African politician who has been a Member of Parliament in the National Assembly since 12 June 2019. Prior to serving in the National Assembly, she was a Member of the Northern Cape Provincial Legislature and the mayor of the Khâi-Ma Local Municipality. Beukes is a member of the African National Congress.

Political career
Beukes is a member of the African National Congress. Prior to her election to the Northern Cape Provincial Legislature, Beukes served as the mayor of the Khâi-Ma Local Municipality. She was elected to the provincial legislature in the April 2009 provincial election. Beukes was re-elected as an MPL in May 2014.

On 10 May 2017, premier Sylvia Lucas appointed Beukes as the Member of the Executive Council (MEC) for Transport, Safety and Liaison, succeeding Pauline Williams. She was sworn in as an MEC the next day. Due to disapproval from the ANC, Lucas rescinded her decision on 1 June 2017.

Parliamentary career
Prior to the 2019 South African general election held on 8 May, Beukes was given the 118th position on the ANC's national list of candidates. She was not elected. However, Beukes entered parliament on 12 June 2019 as a replacement for Siyabonga Cwele. She was given her committee assignments later that month.

Committee assignments
Joint Standing Committee on Defence
Standing Committee on Public Accounts (Alternate member)
Portfolio Committee on Defence and Military Veterans

References

External links
Ms Alexandra Jennifer Beukes at Parliament of South Africa

Living people
Year of birth missing (living people)
Coloured South African people
People from the Northern Cape
Members of the Northern Cape Provincial Legislature
Women members of provincial legislatures of South Africa
Members of the National Assembly of South Africa
Women members of the National Assembly of South Africa
Democratic Alliance (South Africa) politicians